Hillcrest is an unincorporated place in central Warren County, Ohio, United States on U.S. Route 42 about halfway between Mason,  to the southwest, and Lebanon,  to the northeast.  The community straddles the township line between Turtlecreek and Union Townships.  The former Cincinnati, Lebanon and Northern Railway runs just east of the community and once had a stop here called "Turtlecreek".  It is in the Lebanon City School District and is served by the Lebanon telephone exchange and post office.

References
Elva R. Adams.  Warren County Revisited.  [Lebanon, Ohio]:  Warren County Historical Society, 1989.
The Centennial Atlas of Warren County, Ohio.  Lebanon, Ohio:  The Centennial Atlas Association, 1903.
John W. Hauck.  Narrow Gauge in Ohio.  Boulder, Colorado:  Pruett Publishing, 1986.  
Josiah Morrow.  The History of Warren County, Ohio.  Chicago:  W.H. Beers, 1883.  (Reprinted several times)
Ohio Atlas & Gazetteer.  6th ed. Yarmouth, Maine:  DeLorme, 2001.  
Warren County Engineer's Office.  Official Highway Map 2003.  Lebanon, Ohio:  The Office, 2003.

Unincorporated communities in Warren County, Ohio
Unincorporated communities in Ohio